Alfred Bansard des Bois (1848–1920) was a French politician. He served as a member of the Chamber of Deputies from 1881 to 1885 and from 1893 to 1914 while representing Orne.

References

1848 births
1920 deaths
People from Orne
Politicians from Normandy
Republican Federation politicians
Members of the 3rd Chamber of Deputies of the French Third Republic
Members of the 6th Chamber of Deputies of the French Third Republic
Members of the 7th Chamber of Deputies of the French Third Republic
Members of the 8th Chamber of Deputies of the French Third Republic
Members of the 9th Chamber of Deputies of the French Third Republic
Members of the 10th Chamber of Deputies of the French Third Republic